Vynohradivka (until 1946 Novyi Danzig (Новый Данциг)) is a village in Bashtanka Raion (district) in Mykolaiv Oblast of southern Ukraine, at about  northeast by north from the centre of Mykolaiv city. It belongs to Inhulka rural hromada, one of the hromadas of Ukraine.

The village came under attack by Russian forces in 2022, during the Russian invasion of Ukraine.

Demographics
The settlement had 1341 inhabitants in 2001, native language distribution as of the Ukrainian Census of 2001:
Ukrainian: 77.67%
Russian: 6.99%
Moldovan (Romanian): 1.08%
Armenian: 0.79%
German: 0.07%
 other languages: 13.40%

References

Villages in Bashtanka Raion